Jackson Memorial Fountain is a historic fountain located at the entrance to City Park at Parkersburg, Wood County, West Virginia. It was built in 1905 and is a cast iron structure that originally had three tiers.  The second tier is topped by Parkersburg's Lady of the Lake statue.  It features elaborately sculpted and decorated basins and pedestals. The fountain is dedicated to the locally prominent Jackson family, that included General John Jay Jackson and his sons Federal Judge John Jay Jackson, Jr., Governor Jacob B. Jackson, and Circuit Judge and Congressman James M. Jackson.

The original cast-iron bowls were stuck by lightning and destroyed in the early 1990s; their glass-fibre replacements and the rest of the original structure were destroyed in an October 2018 storm, but a replica was erected in 2020.

It was listed on the National Register of Historic Places in 1984.

References

Buildings and structures in Parkersburg, West Virginia
Monuments and memorials on the National Register of Historic Places in West Virginia
Buildings and structures completed in 1905
Fountains in West Virginia
1905 sculptures
Iron sculptures in the United States
Jackson family of West Virginia
National Register of Historic Places in Wood County, West Virginia
1905 establishments in West Virginia
Cast-iron sculptures